Pampa Alegre Aerodrome  is a public use airport located  northwest of Osorno, Los Lagos, Chile.

See also
List of airports in Chile

References

External links 
 Airport record for Pampa Alegre Airport at Landings.com

Airports in Chile
Airports in Los Lagos Region